The Main Force is a jazz album by drummer Elvin Jones recorded in 1976 and released on the Vanguard label.

Reception
The Allmusic review awarded the album 2½ stars stating "This inconsistent 1976 release from the mighty Elvin Jones is most successful when it draws on the high-energy, advanced hard bop style of the drummer's post-Coltrane period. It's a different story when it comes to the date's superfluous accommodations to fusion".

Track listing
 "Salty Iron" (Ryo Kawasaki) - 5:19 
 "Sweet Mama" (Gene Perla) - 6:25 
 "Mini Modes" (David Williams) - 10:35 
 "Philomene" (Ed Bland) - 4:37 
 "Song of Rejoicing After Returning from a Hunt" (Traditional arranged by Gene Perla) - 15:42

Personnel
Elvin Jones  - drums 
Pat LaBarbera, David Liebman (tracks 1 & 2), Steve Grossman, (tracks 2-5), Frank Foster (tracks 3-5) - reeds
Albert Dailey - keyboards
Ryo Kawasaki - guitar
David Williams - bass
Dave Johnson (tracks 1 & 2), Angel Allende (tracks 3-5) - percussion

References

Elvin Jones albums
1976 albums
Vanguard Records albums